The Western Canada Youth Parliament (WCYP) is a biennial event that brings together delegations from the British Columbia Youth Parliament (BCYP), the Alberta Youth Parliament, the Saskatchewan Youth Parliament (SYP) and the Youth Parliament of Manitoba (YPM) for a four-day parliamentary session, usually during the Victoria Day long weekend. The hosting for the WCYP rotates amongst these four youth parliaments. The members at each session of the WCYP debate resolutions in the form of legislation. The rules of parliamentary debate for each WCYP are those of the host province.

WCYP formation and history

The first recorded discussion of holding a western Canadian youth parliament was in 1959. That year, the members of the Alberta Youth Parliament debated but defeated a resolution supporting the creation of a "Western Canada Older Boys' Parliament." It would be over twenty years before the next proposal for a western Canadian youth parliament occurred. In 1981, the Youth Parliament of Manitoba and Northwestern Ontario (as it was then known) organized the first Western Canada Youth Parliament as a project to commemorate their 60th anniversary. It was also designed to be an inter-provincial event to fill the gap between sessions of the now defunct Youth Parliament of Canada/Parlement jeunesse du Canada, which at that time was only held bi-annually. While the British Columbia Youth Parliament did not officially endorse its participation in the first WCYP, representatives of all four western Canadian youth parliaments did attend that first session.

The first Western Canada Youth Parliament in which all four western provincial youth parliaments officially participated was held in the Alberta legislature in 1983.

The success of that WCYP encouraged the constituent parliaments to agree to hold the event bi-annually to alternate with the Youth Parliament of Canada. The next session was held in Winnipeg in July 1985. The BCYP hosted in 1987, holding the session in the senate chambers of the University of Victoria. The Saskatchewan Youth Parliament took its turn hosting the May 1989 session in the provincial Legislative Building in Regina. The 1987 session hosted an ambassador from the Junior Statesmen of America from Washington State. The 1989 session was notable in that it was the first time an ambassador attended from one of the eastern Canadian youth parliaments, being a member of the Nova Scotia Youth Parliament.

The rotation of Westerns has since cycled bi-annually between the four provinces in its original sequence, except for the seventh session, which came after a two-year hiatus.

Future

In 2021, the British Columbia Youth Parliament announced that the WCYP would be expanding, and would become a national organization known as the "Canada Youth Parliament" ("CYP"). According to the announcement, the CYP will meet in July 2021 online via Zoom. The CYP will be an English-language only event, not to be confused with the defunct Youth Parliament of Canada/Parlement jeunesse du Canada.

Locations and personages

References 

 "Youth Parliament of Canada: An Experience in Citizenship" by Ruth Wilson for the Canadian Parliamentary Review: English/French

External links
 British Columbia Youth Parliament
 Alberta Youth Parliament
 Youth Parliament of Manitoba

Canadian youth parliaments
Western Canada
Politics of Western Canada
Recurring events established in 1983
1983 establishments in Canada
Articles needing additional references from April 2021